Fie Udby Erichsen (born 23 April 1985) is a Danish rower. She set the indoor rowing world record for female rowers in the under 12 years old category in 1998 with a time of 7:30.3. She won the silver medal in the single sculls at the 2012 Summer Olympics.

References

 

1985 births
Living people
Danish female rowers
Rowers at the 2012 Summer Olympics
Rowers at the 2016 Summer Olympics
Olympic rowers of Denmark
Olympic silver medalists for Denmark
Olympic medalists in rowing
Medalists at the 2012 Summer Olympics
People from Hobro
Rowers at the 2020 Summer Olympics
Sportspeople from the North Jutland Region